Abhimaan (English: self respect) is a 2016 Indian Bengali-language action comedy film directed by Raj Chakraborty and starring Jeet, Subhashree Ganguly and Sayantika Banerjee. The movie was released in India on 6 October 2016 and in Bangladesh on 30 December 2016.

The film is a remake of the 2013 Telugu film, Attarintiki Daredi (2013) starring Pawan Kalyan, Samantha Akkineni and Pranitha Subhash.

Synopsis
Abhimaan is the story of a proud Italian-Bengali business tycoon Ashok Deb Burman (Sabyasachi Chakraborty) and his estranged daughter Madhuja (Anjana Basu). Madhuja harbours hate for her father — who disowned her because she married someone of lower society against his wishes. Twenty five years have now passed. Mellowed with age, Ashok now wants to mend his relationship with Madhuja. For this, he seeks the help of his grandson, Aditya Deb Burman (Jeet). The rest of the story follows Aditya's leaving Italy and arriving to Kolkata, entering the house posing as a driver and how he gets into many adventures and misadventures and finally succeeds in reconciling his grandfather with his aunt.

Cast
 Jeet as Aditya "Adi" Deb Burman/Deep
 Subhashree Ganguly as Dishani
 Sayantika Banerjee as Srijani
 Sabyasachi Chakrabarty as Ashok Deb Burman, Aditya's grandfather, Madhuja's father 
 Kaushik Banerjee as Arun Deb Burman, Aditya's father
 Anjana Basu as Madhuja Banerjee, Aditya's paternal aunt
 Animesh Bhaduri as Pranab Banerjee, Madhuja's husband, Aditya's paternal uncle
 Biswanath Basu as Khasnobis, Aditya's assistant
 Kanchan Mullick as Doctor
 Kharaj Mukherjee as Bheegu, Madhuja's manager
 Sudip Mukherjee as Yudhisthir Sardar
 Supriyo Dutta as Mr. Thanthaniya
 Swastika Dutta as Ishani
 Buddhadeb Bhattacharjee as Central Home Minister
 Yusuf Chishti as a director in Ashok Deb Burman's company

Soundtrack

References 

2016 films
Bengali-language Indian films
2010s Bengali-language films
2016 action drama films
Bengali remakes of Telugu films
Films scored by Shuddho Roy
Indian action drama films
Reliance Entertainment films
Films directed by Raj Chakraborty